The UEFA European Under-18 Championship 1999 Final Tournament was held in Sweden.

Teams

The following teams qualified for the tournament:

 
 
 
 
 
 
 
  (host)

Group stage

Group A

Group B
Ireland beats Spain in this group based on

Third place match

Final

See also
 1999 UEFA European Under-18 Championship qualifying

External links
Results by RSSSF

1999
International association football competitions hosted by Sweden
Under-18
1999 in Swedish football
July 1999 sports events in Europe
1999 in youth association football